Brian Young may refer to:

 Brian Young (American football, born 1972), American football coach and head football coach of Stetson University
 Brian Young (American football, born 1977), American football coach and former defensive tackle
 Brian Young (drummer), drummer for New York-based pop band Fountains of Wayne
 Brian Young (politician) (born 1949), Canadian politician in Nova Scotia
 Brian Young (ice hockey) (born 1958), Canadian ice hockey defenceman
 Brian Young (Royal Navy officer) (1930–2009), British Royal Navy officer
 Brian Young (magistrate) (born 1954), served as magistrate of the British Overseas Territory of Pitcairn Island

See also
 Bryan Young (disambiguation)